Dale H. "Ted" Tetzlaff (3 June 1903, Los Angeles, California –  7 January 1995, Sausalito, California) was an Academy Award-nominated Hollywood cinematographer active in the 1930s and 1940s.

Career
Tetzlaff was particularly favored by the actress Carole Lombard, whom he photographed in 10 films.

After World War II service as a US Army Major, he became a film director, and directed about a dozen films from 1947 to 1957, including the film noir classic The Window (1949).

His father was racecar driver and film stuntman Teddy Tetzlaff (1883–1929).

Selected filmography

As cinematographer

 Atta Boy (1926)
 Sunshine of Paradise Alley (1926)
 Ragtime (1927)
 Polly of the Movies (1927)
The Masked Angel (1928)
 The Apache (1928)
The Power of the Press (1928)
 Into No Man's Land (1928)
 Stool Pigeon (1928)
 The Devil's Cage (1928)
The Donovan Affair (1929)
Hurricane (1929)
The Younger Generation (1929)
Mexicali Rose (1929)
 Acquitted (1929)
 The Faker (1929)
 Hell's Island (1930)
Soldiers and Women (1930)
 Personality (1930)
The Squealer  (1930)
Tol'able David (1930)
Men in Her Life (1931)
 The Lightning Flyer (1931)
 The Last Parade (1931)
 A Dangerous Affair (1931)
The Night Club Lady (1932)
 The Night Mayor (1932)
Man Against Woman (1932)
 This Sporting Age (1932)
Brief Moment (1933)
Child of Manhattan (1933)
Transatlantic Merry-Go-Round (1934)
Fugitive Lovers (1934)
Rumba (1935)
Hands Across the Table (1935)
Paris in Spring (1935)
The Princess Comes Across (1936)
My Man Godfrey (1936)
Easy Living (1937)
Swing High, Swing Low (1937)
True Confession (1937)
Fools for Scandal (1938)
Artists and Models Abroad (1938)
Remember the Night (1940)
The Mad Doctor (1941)
The Road to Zanzibar (1941)
I Married a Witch (1942)
The Lady is Willing (1942)
The Talk of the Town (1942) – Academy Award nomination for Best Cinematography
You Were Never Lovelier (1942)
The More the Merrier (1943)
The Enchanted Cottage (1945)
Notorious (1946)

As director

Riffraff (1947)
Fighting Father Dunne (1948) 
The Window (1949)
Johnny Allegro (1949)
A Dangerous Profession (1949)
The White Tower (1950)
Gambling House (1951) 
The Treasure of Lost Canyon (1952)
Terror on a Train (1953) (aka Time Bomb)
Son of Sinbad (1955)
The Young Land (1959)

References

External links
 
 Ted Tetzlaff They Shoot Pictures

1903 births
1995 deaths
American cinematographers
Mountaineering film directors
People from Sausalito, California
Film directors from Los Angeles